In astronomy, the Sagittarius Stream is a long, complex structure made of stars that wrap around the Milky Way galaxy in an orbit that nearly crosses the galactic poles. It consists of tidally stripped stars from the Sagittarius Dwarf Elliptical Galaxy, resulting from the process of merging with the Milky Way over a period of billions of years.

This stellar stream was originally proposed in 1995 by Donald Lynden-Bell after analyzing the distribution of globular clusters in the Milky Way. The actual structure was identified by Newberg and associates (2002) plus Majewski and associates (2003) using data from the 2MASS and SDSS surveys. In 2006, Belokurov and his collaborators found that the Sagittarius Stream has two branches.

When the progenitor object was shredded apart during the interaction, it sent oscillations (analogous to sound waves) through the Milky Way spiral arm structure. The effects of the oscillations are observed today as layers of alternately denser and sparser star distributions, above and below the Solar System. Presently, the position of the Sagittarius Stream relative to the observed layers make the Sagittarius Dwarf Elliptical Galaxy the strongest candidate for this intruding object.

See also
 List of stellar streams

References

External links
Deriving The Shape Of The Galactic Stellar Disc (SkyNightly) March 17, 2006
Deriving the shape of the Galactic stellar disc, A&A press release, March 16, 2006

Milky Way
Sagittarius Dwarf Spheroidal Galaxy
Milky Way Subgroup
Stellar streams
?